Riyadus-Salikhin may transliterate:

Russian Риядус-Салихийн, referring to the Riyad-us Saliheen Brigade of Martyrs

Arabic رياض الصالحين, referring to the hadith collection The Meadows of the Righteous